One Bedroom is a 2003 studio album by The Sea and Cake, released on Thrill Jockey.

Track listing

Personnel
 Sam Prekop – vocals, guitar, synthesizer
 Archer Prewitt – guitar, piano, synthesizer, vocals
 Eric Claridge – bass guitar
 John McEntire – drums, percussion, piano, synthesizer
 Mikael Jorgensen – electric piano (on "One Bedroom" and "Interiors")
 John Navin – vocals (on "Sound & Vision")
 Frank Navin – vocals (on "Sound & Vision")

Charts

References

External links
 
 One Bedroom at Thrill Jockey

2003 albums
The Sea and Cake albums
Thrill Jockey albums